Barmby Moor is a village and civil parish in the East Riding of Yorkshire, England. It lies north of the A1079 road where it is met by the B1246 road that passes through the village.

According to the 2011 UK census, Barmby Moor parish had a population of 1,114, an increase on the 2001 UK census figure of 1,065.

The village was originally a market town with a coaching inn. It has a church, dedicated to St Catherine, chapel, village hall and a primary school. There is also a  post office and a pub, The Boot & Slipper. The church and the Manor House were designated as Grade II* listed buildings in 1967 and are now recorded in the National Heritage List for England, maintained by Historic England.

Each July a traditional fete – the Barmby Feast – is held in the village.

Education

Barmby Moor Primary School is a Church of England school. The foundation governors are appointed by the church. The school maintains close links with St Catherine's Church and other church schools within the Diocese of York.

Barmby Moor's pre-school offers child-care and early education and it is located at the former school house now houses a Kids Club and a Pre-School. Both are charities run by locals.

References

External links

Barmby Moor CE Primary School
Barmby Moor Parish Council
Barmby Moor Pre school

Villages in the East Riding of Yorkshire
Civil parishes in the East Riding of Yorkshire